Freeland is an unincorporated community in Baltimore County, Maryland, United States.

External links
Freeland Historical Marker at The Historical Marker Database

References

Unincorporated communities in Baltimore County, Maryland
Unincorporated communities in Maryland